Creative Programs, Inc., also known as CPI, is a subsidiary of ABS-CBN Corporation that operates and distributes pay TV channels and provides pay-per-view services to direct-to-home satellite and cable television providers in the Philippines. Since 2019, CPI also engages in book and magazine publishing through its subsidiary ABS-CBN Publishing, following their merger.

Channel distribution

Owned and operated channels
Cinema One – a channel that shows Filipino films both mainstream and independent.
Jeepney TV – a channel that shows classic TV programs of ABS-CBN.
Metro Channel – a channel targeted to upscale women and formerly known as Lifestyle.
Metro Channel HD – a high-definition simulcast of Metro Channel.
Myx – a music channel targeted to Filipinos.

Local channels owned & operated by ABS-CBN
ANC  – an English language news and business channel targeted to Filipinos.
ANC HD – a high-definition simulcast of ANC.
Cine Mo! - an all-day Filipino movie and entertainment channel.
Kapamilya Channel – a channel that set up as an interim replacement of the main terrestrial network.
Kapamilya Channel HD – a high-definition simulcast of Kapamilya Channel.
Knowledge Channel – an educational channel owned by ABS-CBN and Knowledge Channel Foundation, Inc.
PIE – an interactive channel owned by ABS-CBN and BEAM TV.
ABS-CBN TeleRadyo –  a Filipino language news channel targeted to Filipino masses.

International channels
Aniplus
antv
Asian Food Network
Boomerang
Cartoon Network
Celestial Classic Movies
Chinese Entertainment Channel
CinemaWorld
Cinemax
CNBC Asia
CNN International
CNN Philippines
Discovery Asia
DreamWorks Channel
FashionTV
Global Trekker
HBO
HITS
HITS Movies
HLN
K-Plus
Kix
Love Nature
MTV 90s
MTV Live
NHK World-Japan
Nickelodeon
Nick Jr.
Outdoor Channel
Paramount Network
Rock Entertainment
Rock Action
Thrill
tvN
Warner TV
ZooMoo

Pay per view
Cinema One Premium HD (inactive)
Kapamilya Box Office (inactive)
KBO on Sky PPV (inactive)
Super KBO (inactive)
Star Cinema PPV (inactive)
Sky Movies PPV
Sky Sports PPV

Live streaming
Kapamilya Online Live
Pinoy Big Brother 24/7 live streaming (inactive)

Others
Sky Freeview

Defunct channels
ABS-CBN HD (2015–2020) – a high-definition simulcast of ABS-CBN.
ABS-CBN Regional Channel (2016–2018) – programming produced regionally by ABS-CBN Regional stations.
S+A HD (2016–2020) – a high-definition simulcast of S+A.
Asianovela Channel (2018–2020) – a channel that airs drama series and movies from South Korea, Taiwan, China and Japan from ABS-CBN TV Plus.
Balls (2008–2015) – a premium sports channel targeted to upscale men.
Balls HD (2009; 2013–2015) – a high-definition feed of Balls.
CgeTV (2010–2012) – an interactive user-generated channel.
Hero (2005–2018) – a channel that shows Tagalog-dubbed anime; now a pop culture web portal under ABS-CBN Digital Media
Lifestyle (1999–2018) – a channel targeted to upscale women.
Liga (2018-2020; also on HD) – a sports channel that airs international football and local sporting events.
Maxxx (2008–2010) – a channel targeted to upscale men.
Movie Central (2018-2020) –  a digital English movie channel from ABS-CBN TV Plus, now a programming block on Kapamilya Channel during overnight hours.
O Shopping (16:9 widescreen) (2013–2020) – a shopping channel owned by ABS-CBN and CJ Group of Korea; now a shopping digital web portal under ABS-CBN Digital Media.
Tag (2016–2018) – a channel that shows Tagalog-dubbed foreign movies.
Velvet (2008–2014) – a channel targeted to upscale women.
 Yey! (2011-2020) - a digital children's channel from ABS-CBN TV Plus, now a programming block on Kapamilya Channel, Jeepney TV, and A2Z.

References

External links

 
Television production companies of the Philippines
Mass media companies of the Philippines
Entertainment companies of the Philippines
Cable television companies of the Philippines
Companies based in Quezon City
Entertainment companies established in 1995
1995 establishments in the Philippines
ABS-CBN Corporation
Assets owned by ABS-CBN Corporation